WEIU may refer to:

 WEIU (FM), a radio station (88.9 FM) licensed to Charleston, Illinois, United States
 WEIU-TV, a television station (channel 51 analog/50 digital) licensed to Charleston, Illinois, United States
 Women's Educational and Industrial Union, a Boston-based women's exchange founded in 1877